The coastline of Norway is formed along the Skagerrak, North Sea, Norwegian Sea, and Barents Sea. This considers only the mainland coastline and excludes Svalbard.

Much of Norway's wealth is linked to its long coastline; for example, the petroleum industry, maritime transport, fishing, and fish farming.

The Norwegian landscape was formed by glaciers that eroded the basement rock and formed countless valleys and fjords, as well as the characteristic skerries that protect the land from the ocean along most of the mainland coastline. There are only a few shorter or longer stretches where the mainland is exposed to the open sea along the coast: at Lindesnes, Lista, Jæren, Stad, Hustadvika, and Folda in Trøndelag, and along the Varanger Peninsula.

Facts
Because of countless peninsulas and inlets, large and small islands, holms, and skerries, the Norwegian coast is among the longest in the world. Some facts about the Norwegian coastline:
Municipalities in Norway that have a coast: 279
Mainland coastline (with fjords and bays): 
Island coastline: 
Total coastline (mainland and islands): 
Number of islands: 239,057
Number of skerries: 81,192

Gallery

References

Coasts of Norway